Mansur High school or Taleqani High School (in South Azerbaijani: ,) is an old high school located in city center of Tabriz. A reconstruction of the main building started in August, 2012.

See also
American Memorial School in Tabriz
Dar ol-Fonoon
Higher education in Iran

References

External links 
 Campaign to protest the destruction of Taleqani(Mansur) High School (Facebook Page)
 Mansur High School (Facebook Page)

Educational institutions established in 1945
High schools in Iran
Architecture in Iran
Schools in Tabriz
1945 establishments in Iran